Research on Language and Computation was a quarterly peer-reviewed academic journal covering research in computational linguistics and natural language processing. It was established in 2003 and ceased publication in December 2010. The journal was published by  Springer Science+Business Media.

Abstracting and indexing 
The journal is abstracted and indexed in:

External links 

 

Computational linguistics
Linguistics journals
Springer Science+Business Media academic journals
English-language journals
Quarterly journals
Publications established in 2003
Publications disestablished in 2010